Daniel Silva dos Santos, also known as Daniel Tijolo (May 30, 1982 - February 10, 2019), was a Brazilian defensive midfielder who played several years in Japan.

Club statistics
Updated to 23 February 2016.

Honours
Paraná State League: 2006

References

External links

 Profile at Oita Trinita
 Daniel se apresentam no Cruzeiro 
 Guardian Stats Centre 

1982 births
2019 deaths
Brazilian footballers
Brazilian expatriate footballers
People from Cabo Frio
Associação Desportiva Cabofriense players
Paysandu Sport Club players
Ituano FC players
Cruzeiro Esporte Clube players
Associação Desportiva São Caetano players
Ventforet Kofu players
Nagoya Grampus players
Oita Trinita players
J1 League players
J2 League players
J3 League players
Expatriate footballers in Japan
Brazilian expatriate sportspeople in Japan
Association football midfielders
Deaths from lung cancer
Deaths from cancer in Rio de Janeiro (state)
Sportspeople from Rio de Janeiro (state)